Personal Affair is a 1953 British drama film directed by Anthony Pelissier and starring Gene Tierney, Leo Genn and Glynis Johns. It was made at Pinewood Studios by Two Cities Films.

Plot summary
Teenager Barbara Vining (Glynis Johns) has an unrequited crush on her Latin-language teacher, Stephen Barlow (Leo Genn). When Barlow's wife Kay (Gene Tierney) finds out, she confronts Barbara, who is humiliated and runs off to London. Stephen chases after her near a river to try to calm her down.

Barbara does not return home to her parents Henry (Walter Fitzgerald) and Vi (Megs Jenkins) for three days. During that time Stephen is accused by the community, without any evidence, of causing her death, causing him to lose his job and almost his marriage. Barbara's gossipy spinster Aunt Evelyn (Pamela Brown), who lives with the family, makes the situation considerably worse with her innuendo, by projecting her own, much earlier unrequited love experience, onto her niece.

Cast
 Gene Tierney as Kay Barlow
 Leo Genn as Stephen Barlow
 Glynis Johns as Barbara Vining
 Walter Fitzgerald as Henry Vining
 Pamela Brown as Aunt Evelyn
 Megs Jenkins as Vi Vining
 Michael Hordern  as Headmaster Griffith  
 Thora Hird  as Mrs. Usher  
 Norah Gorsen as Phoebe
 Nanette Newman as Sally
 Martin Boddey as Police Inspector

Critical reaction

The film was reviewed by Bosley Crowther of The New York Times in the 23 October 1954 edition.  Crowther called the film "a decent, eventually tedious film".

References

External links

 

1953 films
British black-and-white films
1953 crime drama films
British crime drama films
Films about educators
Films shot at Pinewood Studios
Films set in England
Films directed by Anthony Pelissier
Films scored by William Alwyn
1950s English-language films
1950s British films